The Ace of Spades is a 1925 American silent Western film serial directed by Henry MacRae. The serial is considered to be a lost film.

Cast

Chapter titles

The Fatal Card
No Greater Love
Whirling Waters
Fires of Sacrifice
Thundering Hoofs
Flung from the Sky
The Trail of Terror
The Lariat of Death
Fingers of Fate
The Road to Ruin
The Chasm of Peril
The Avalanche
The Fury of Fate
The Chasm of Courage
A Deal of Destiny

See also
 List of American films of 1925
 List of film serials
 List of film serials by studio
 List of lost films

References

External links

 
 

1925 films
1925 Western (genre) films
1925 lost films
American silent serial films
American black-and-white films
Films directed by Henry MacRae
Lost Western (genre) films
Lost American films
Silent American Western (genre) films
Universal Pictures film serials
1920s American films